Shahrak-e Abraj (also known as Shahrak, Shahrak-e Abraj-e ‘Olyā, and Shahrak-e Qadīm Abraj) is a village in Dorudzan Rural District, Dorudzan District, Marvdasht County, Fars Province, Iran. At the 2006 census, its population was 2,747, in 606 families.

References 

Populated places in Marvdasht County